Trewidland is a hamlet in the civil parish of St Keyne and Trewidland, in east Cornwall, England. It is about two miles northeast of Duloe.  It is situated in the Looe Valley, which has been designated an Area of Outstanding Natural Beauty. The village shop and post office closed some years ago, as did the two Methodist chapels. There is also no pub in the village. Most residents rely on the local market town of Liskeard, approximately 3 miles away, for shopping and other local services. However, it does have a primary school, a village hall, and a snooker room. Until 1 April 2021 it was in the parish of Dobwalls and Trewidland, it was moved into St Keyne parish and that parish was renamed "St Keyne and Trewidland".

References

Hamlets in Cornwall